"Shattered Dreams" is a song by English musical group Johnny Hates Jazz from their debut studio album, Turn Back the Clock (1988). Written by the band's lead singer Clark Datchler, the song was released in March 1987 as the album's lead single. "Shattered Dreams" entered the UK Singles Chart at number 161 and gained popularity through extensive radio play and video rotation on MTV, eventually peaking at number five in May 1987 and spending three weeks at that position. It also reached the top 10 in Canada, Ireland, Norway, Switzerland, and West Germany.

In the United States, the song was released with an alternative music video shot entirely in black and white and directed by David Fincher, which Datchler preferred. The single topped Billboards Adult Contemporary chart for one week and peaked at number two for three non-consecutive weeks on the Billboard Hot 100.

Clark Datchler and the group would soon part, and Datchler released an acoustic version of the song as a track on his 1990 Virgin solo single "Crown of Thorns". He later re-recorded a slower version on his 2007 album Tomorrow. The song has been covered by boyband Ultra, on their 1999 eponymous album; by house music artist Jaybee in 2005; by Russian singer Sergey Lazarev in 2007; and in 2009 by Quentin Elias, former singer for French boy band Alliage, by American Idol season 7 winner David Cook during his Declaration tour.

Background
Singer Clark Datchler wrote "Shattered Dreams" in a small studio he had set up in the front room of his parents' house. He had an upright piano, a 4-track portastudio, a drum machine, and a keyboard in the studio. He wrote the song quickly, but the bongo solo took a while to conceive. Datchler knew he had written something special by his dad's reaction. Usually, his dad would offer musical advice if he asked for it, but would otherwise leave Clark alone. But this time, his dad walked in and told him he had written a big hit, and believed in the song's potential when few other people in the music industry did.

On the lyrics, Datchler said:

Track listings

7-inch and US cassette single
A. "Shattered Dreams" – 3:30
B. "My Secret Garden"

UK maxi-cassette single
A1. "Shattered Dreams" (12-inch extended mix)
A2. "My Secret Garden"
B1. "Me and My Foolish Heart" (new version)
B2. "Living in the Past"

12-inch single
A1. "Shattered Dreams" (12-inch extended mix) – 5:14
B1. "Shattered Dreams" (7-inch mix) – 3:30
B2. "My Secret Garden"

Japanese mini-album
 "Shattered Dreams"
 "Shattered Dreams" (extended mix)
 "My Secret Garden"
 "I Don't Want to Be a Hero"

Charts

Weekly charts

Year-end charts

Sergey Lazarev version

In 2006, Russian singer Sergey Lazarev covered the song with a new arrangement. This was his first solo outing outside the post-Soviet zone and his first international single to be formally released in the United Kingdom. It reached No. 19 on the Russian TopHit Top Radio Hits chart.

Track listing
 "Shattered Dreams" [Radio Edit]
 "Shattered Dreams" [Metro Edit]
 "Shattered Dreams" [Kid 79" Remix]
 "Shattered Dreams" [Metro 12 Mix]
 "Shattered Dreams" [Groove Brothers Mix]
 "Shattered Dreams" [Hardrum Mix]
 "Shattered Dreams" [Video]

References

1987 songs
1987 singles
1988 singles
2006 singles
Black-and-white music videos
Johnny Hates Jazz songs
Music videos directed by David Fincher
Sergey Lazarev songs
Songs about dreams
Songs written by Clark Datchler
Virgin Records singles